Amsterdam Science Park is a railway station in the borough Amsterdam-Oost in Amsterdam, Netherlands. The station serves the Science Park Amsterdam and the Watergraafsmeer, as well as Amsterdam University College and the Science Park campus of the University of Amsterdam. The construction of the station started in June 2009 and it was opened on 13 December 2009 by Amsterdam Mayor Job Cohen. It is one of the fast moving railway station.

Train services 
The following trains operated by NS are serving the station:
2× per hour local Sprinter service Amsterdam – Weesp – Almere – Lelystad – Zwolle
2× per hour local Sprinter service Hoofddorp – Schiphol – Amsterdam – Hilversum – Amersfoort

Bus services 
The following bus service is operated by GVB and stops at the railway station:
Line 40: Station Amstel – Watergraafsmeer – Science Park – Muiderpoort

References

External links 
 
  Amsterdam Science Park

Amsterdam-Oost
Science Park
Railway stations in North Holland